Flies to Flame is the second EP by post-metal band Rosetta, released in 2014 on Translation Loss Records.

Track list

References

Rosetta (band) albums
2014 EPs